Yokotʼan (self-denomination), also known as Chontal Maya, is a Maya language of the Cholan family spoken in 2020 by around 60,000 Chontal Maya people of the Mexican state of Tabasco. According to the National Catalog of Indigenous Languages of Mexico-INALI, Yokotʼan has at least four dialects: Nacajuca (Central), Centla (Northern), Macuspana (Southern) and Tamulte (Eastern).

Distribution
The Chontal Maya are concentrated in 159 settlements in 5 municipalities of Tabasco (Brown 2005:122).

Centla
Centro
Jonuta
Macuspana
Nacajuca (comprising more than 50% of the Chontal Maya population)

Some Chontal settlements near the town of Nacajuca include (Brown 2005:116):

El Tigre
Saloya
Guatacaloa
Olcuatitan
Tucta
Mazatehuapa
Tapotzingo
Guaytalpa
San Simón
Tecoluta
Oxiacapue
Guadalupe
El Sitio
Tamulte

Some Chontal settlements in the northeastern Centla region include (Brown 2005:116):

Cuauhtemoc
Vicente Guerrero
Allende
Simón Sarlat
Quitin Arauz (on the Río Usumacinta)

Chontal settlements near Macuspana include Benito Juárez and Aquiles Serdan (Brown 2005).

Phonology

Consonants

Vowels

References

Brown, Denise Fay. 2005. "The Chontal Maya of Tabasco." In Sandstrom, Alan R., and Enrique Hugo García Valencia. 2005. Native peoples of the Gulf Coast of Mexico. Tucson: University of Arizona Press.
Keller, Kathryn C. and Plácido Luciano G., compilers. 1997. Diccionario Chontal de Tabasco.

Knowles, Susan Marie. 1984. "A descriptive grammar of Chontal Maya (San Carlos dialect)." Thesis (Ph. D.)--Tulane University, 1984.

"La lengua maya-chontal de Tabasco / [selección de textos y edición, Tomás Pérez Suárez]." 1984. Emiliano Zapata, Tabasco, Mexico : Editora Municipal, H. Ayuntamiento Constitucional (1983–1985), 1984.

Agglutinative languages
Mayan languages
Mesoamerican languages
Indigenous languages of Mexico